This is a list of year-end number-one albums for New Zealand. Recorded Music NZ publishes the country's official weekly record charts.

Number-one albums

Key
 – Album of New Zealand origin

See also
List of best-selling albums in New Zealand

Notes

References

Year-end